José Luis Torres (born 17 July 1995) is an Argentine professional footballer who plays as a forward for Mitre.

Career
Torres had a youth spell with Comercio Central Unidos. He first featured at senior level for Independiente de Fernández, prior to returning to Comercio Central Unidos. He featured for the Santiago del Estero outfit in 2015, which preceded a move to Unión Santiago. He was selected nine times in all competitions by the fellow fourth tier side. He returned to Comercio Central Unidos in 2016, remaining until mid-2018 whilst taking his overall tallies for them to forty-eight appearances and seven goals. On 30 June, Torres joined Mitre of Primera B Nacional. He made his professional debut on 2 November versus Instituto.

Career statistics
.

References

External links

1995 births
Living people
People from Santiago del Estero
Argentine footballers
Association football forwards
Primera Nacional players
Club Atlético Mitre footballers
Sportspeople from Santiago del Estero Province